General Dynamics Land Systems (GDLS) is a manufacturer of military vehicles such as tanks and lighter armored fighting vehicles.

History
In February 1982 Chrysler announced the sale of Chrysler Defense, its profitable defense subsidiary, to General Dynamics for US$348.5 million. The sale was completed in March 1982 for the revised figure of US$336.1 million. Renamed General Dynamics Land Systems, the division operates the Lima Army Tank Plant and General Dynamics Anniston Operations in Anniston, Alabama, along with smaller operations in Tallahassee, Florida, and Scranton, Pennsylvania. Headquarters are located in Sterling Heights, Michigan. As of 2016, General Dynamics Land Systems employed 6,800 people.

General Dynamics Land Systems Canada
In 2003 it acquired Steyr-Daimler-Puch Spezialfahrzeug GmbH (SSF), the land defense vehicles unit of Steyr-Daimler-Puch, and General Dynamics Land Systems – Canada (GDLS-C), a subsidiary of General Dynamics based in London, Ontario, purchased General Motors Diesel's GM Defense unit from General Motors. It supplies such armored vehicles as the LAV-25, the Stryker, and other models based on these chassis. The London operation is located at GM Diesel's old plant on Oxford Street East. SSF merged into the General Dynamics European Land Systems unit.

After the division secured a fourteen-year, $15-billion deal to supply light armoured vehicles to Saudi Arabia, Unifor representatives expressed concern that the London plant would suffer financially due to negative publicity surrounding the deal and that union members employed at the plant would lose their jobs. Both Bloc Québécois Leader Gilles Duceppe and New Democrat Thomas Mulcair challenged Prime Minister Stephen Harper on the secrecy surrounding military sales to Saudi Arabia,  while David Perry, senior analyst with the Canadian Defence and Foreign Affairs Institute, argued that secrecy in trade details is part of a pragmatic foreign trade policy necessary for a domestic industry in a global market.

Vehicles 

 M1 Abrams, the American main battle tank 
 K1 88-Tank, the South Korean main battle tank
 Light Armoured Vehicle, a family of infantry fighting vehicles 
 Stryker, a family of eight-wheeled armored fighting vehicles derived from the Canadian LAV III
 Ajax, a family of tracked armoured fighting vehicles being developed for the British Army
 Buffalo, a wheeled mine resistant, ambush protected (MRAP) armored military vehicle
 Cougar, an MRAP and infantry mobility vehicle structured to be resistant to landmines and improvised munitions
 Multi-Utility Tactical Transport (MUTT), currently being trialed by the United States military
 Griffin, a series of armoured fighting vehicles under development and being offered under the United States Army Next Generation Combat Vehicle program
 Mobile Protected Firepower (MPF), a prototype undergoing Soldier Vehicle Assessment (SVA)
 Tracked Robot 10-Ton (TRX), a robotic combat vehicle platform

References

External links
 

Land Systems
Defense companies of the United States
Military vehicle manufacturers
Motor vehicle manufacturers based in Michigan
Companies based in Macomb County, Michigan
Sterling Heights, Michigan
American companies established in 1982
Vehicle manufacturing companies established in 1982
1982 establishments in Michigan
Chrysler